Megacyllene antennata is a species of beetle in the family Cerambycidae occurring in the southwestern United States, where its larvae feed on mesquite trees. It was described by White in 1855.

References

Megacyllene
Beetles described in 1855